Radio Volga was a radio station for the Soviet armed forces stationed in the former East Germany and Czechoslovakia, broadcasting mainly in Russian.

Broadcasting station
Based in Potsdam, Radio Volga broadcast from the Königs Wusterhausen radio facility near Berlin, as well as the Burg AM transmitter near Magdeburg.

From 1967 to 1976 Radio Volga used the 350-meter SL-3 tower, 2.2 kilometers from the transmitter. After it collapsed in 1976, one of the site's two 210-meter high steel tube masts was used instead. Radio Volga originally broadcast on the longwave frequency 283 kHz.

Programming
Beside programs for the Soviet soldiers stationed in the GDR, Radio Volga also broadcast German language programmes from Radio Moscow. After German reunification in 1990, transmitting time was rented to the German-language news station Radioropa Info, broadcasting on 261 kHz.

Television
Soviet Central Television's main channel, TSS-1, was also relayed in East Germany via satellite.

Shutdown
With the departure of Russian troops from Germany, Radio Volga ceased broadcasting in June 1994. Radioropa Info took over its frequency, broadcasting from late 1994 to 2000, first from Daun and then from Leipzig. In 1999 a new cage aerial was mounted on the 324-meter radio mast in Burg.

See also
AFN Berlin
American Forces Network
British Forces Broadcasting Service
Radio forces françaises de Berlin

References

External links
 Burg, früher 261 kHz  — brief history of transmissions on 261 kHz in Germany

Brandenburg
Defunct radio stations in East Germany
German-language radio stations
International broadcasters
Military of the Soviet Union
Russian-language radio stations
Saxony-Anhalt
Military broadcasting
Radio stations established in 1945
Radio stations disestablished in 1994
1945 establishments in Germany
1994 disestablishments in Germany